Elkin Creek Guest Ranch Airport  is located near to Elkin Creek Guest Ranch, British Columbia, Canada.

References

Registered aerodromes in British Columbia
Cariboo Regional District